Hamayun Omar is an Afghan cricketer. He made his List A debut for Amo Region in the 2017 Ghazi Amanullah Khan Regional One Day Tournament on 13 August 2017. He made his first-class debut for Speen Ghar Region in the 2017–18 Ahmad Shah Abdali 4-day Tournament on 20 October 2017.

References

External links
 

Year of birth missing (living people)
Living people
Afghan cricketers
Amo Sharks cricketers
Spin Ghar Tigers cricketers
Place of birth missing (living people)